ASU, Asu or asu may refer to:

Languages
 Asu language (Nigeria), spoken in Western Nigeria
 Asu language (Tanzania), spoken by the Gweno people in the Kilimanjaro Region of Tanzania. Also called Pare.

Education
In Bahrain
 Applied Science University (Bahrain)
In Egypt
 Ain Shams University
In Japan
 Aichi Sangyo University
 Aichi Shukutoku University
In Lithuania
 Aleksandras Stulginskis University
In Mongolia
American School of Ulaanbaatar
In the Philippines
 Aklan State University
In Russia
 Altai State University
In the United States
 Arizona State University, Tempe, Arizona
 Appalachian State University, Boone, North Carolina
 Alabama State University, Montgomery, Alabama
 Angelo State University, San Angelo, Texas
 Albany State University, Albany, Georgia
 Alcorn State University, Lorman, Mississippi
 American Sentinel University, Denver, Colorado
 American Sports University, San Bernardino, California
 Arkansas State University, Jonesboro, Arkansas
 Augusta State University, Augusta, Georgia
 Adams State University, Alamosa, Colorado

Places
Asu  or Asow may refer to several places in Iran:
 Asu, Gilan
 Asu, Hormozgan
 Asu, Razavi Khorasan
 Asu, South Khorasan
 Asu Temple, a Hindu temple in Central Java, Indonesia
 Asunción, Paraguay, sometimes referred locally as Asu.

Other uses
 ASU, the IATA code for the Silvio Pettirossi International Airport in Luque, near Asunción, Paraguay
 ASU-57, Soviet airborne support gun
 ASU-85, Soviet airborne support gun
 Asu (name), a Turkish first name 
 Aikido Schools of Ueshiba
 Air separation unit
 Airport Security Unit (disambiguation)
 Army Service Uniform
 Australian Services Union
 Active service unit, individual units with the Provisional Irish Republican Army
 Adobe Setup Utility
 Arab Socialist Union (disambiguation), the name of a number of political parties in the Arab world
 Asian Skating Union
 Arbitrary Strength Unit, a performance value for mobile phone signals